The 2013–14 season is Oldham Athletic's 17th consecutive season in the third division of the English football league system and Lee Johnson's first full season as manager of the club.

The Latics faced a summer of rebuilding on and off the pitch as 18 players were out of contract from the 2012–13 season and work finally recommenced on the demolition of the old Broadway Stand in preparation for its replacement by the new North Stand. Dean Bouzanis, Robbie Simpson, Connor Hughes, Liam Jacob, Alex Cisak, Lee Croft and Dan Taylor were all released at the end of the 2012–13 season with new contracts handed to Glenn Belezika, Cliff Byrne, Connor Brown, David Mellor, James Tarkowski and Kirk Millar as well as youngsters Joe Cooper, Chris Sutherland, Luke Simpson and Danny Gosset. Matt Smith opted to join Leeds United after his impressive run of goals during the 2012-13 FA Cup while Dean Furman joined former manager Paul Dickov at Doncaster Rovers and Jean-Yves Mvoto joined Barnsley.

In their place, Johnson signed wingers Sidney Schmeltz and James Dayton as well as strengthening the centre of midfield with Anton Rodgers and the permanent acquisition of Korey Smith who had ended the previous season on loan at Boundary Park from Norwich City. A trio of forwards were also recruited: Charlie MacDonald, Jonson Clarke-Harris and, following a protracted contract dispute with Swindon Town, Adam Rooney. Johnson signed goalkeeper Mark Oxley on a season long loan from Hull City but his only defensive acquisition before the season began was the young Latvian centre back, Edijs Joksts. As a result, the season began with young midfielder David Mellor employed at centre back alongside James Tarkowski.

The season began positively for Oldham with a 4–3 victory away at Stevenage. This was followed by defeat at home to Derby in the first round of the Capital One Cup and a run of games in which Oldham were praised for their attractive style of play but ultimately achieved only 8 points from their first 10 league games. In the meantime, the summer transfer window had closed with the departure of Baxter to Sheffield United for an undisclosed fee, the return of Danny Philliskirk and the arrival of defensive duo Matteo Lanzoni and Genseric Kusunga.

Squad & Coaching Staff

First Team Squad
Includes all players who were awarded a squad number during the season. Last updated on 15 December 2013
*Total appearances and goals as at the end of the 2013–14 season

Management & Coaching Staff

League table

Transfers

Squad statistics

Appearances
Last updated on 24 November 2013

Goal Scorers
Last updated on 15 December 2013

Disciplinary
Last updated on 15 December 2013

Results and fixtures

Pre–season friendlies

League One

FA Cup

League Cup

Football League Trophy

References

Oldham Athletic A.F.C. seasons
Oldham Athletic